3754 Kathleen, provisional designation , is a large background asteroid from the outer regions of the asteroid belt, approximately  in diameter. It was discovered at the Lowell Observatory near Flagstaff, Arizona, on 16 March 1931, by American astronomer Clyde Tombaugh, who named it after his granddaughter Kathleen Clifford. The assumed C-type asteroid has a rotation period of 11.18 hours. It is the second-highest numbered main-belt asteroid larger than 50 kilometers.

Orbit and classification 

Kathleen is a non-family asteroid from the main belt's background population. It orbits the Sun in the outer main-belt at a distance of 2.8–3.5 AU once every 5 years and 7 months (2,050 days; semi-major axis of 3.16 AU). Its orbit has an eccentricity of 0.11 and an inclination of 8° with respect to the ecliptic.

Physical characteristics 

Kathleen is an assumed carbonaceous C-type asteroid.

Rotation period 

Several rotational lightcurves of Kathleen have been obtained from photometric observations since March 2004. Analysis of the best-rated lightcurve gave a rotation period of 11.18 hours with a consolidated brightness amplitude between 0.13 and 0.20 magnitude.

Diameter and albedo 

According to the surveys carried out by the Infrared Astronomical Satellite IRAS, the Japanese Akari satellite and the NEOWISE mission of NASA's Wide-field Infrared Survey Explorer, Kathleen measures between 53.23 and 59.367 kilometers in diameter and its surface has an albedo between 0.0379 and 0.0624.

The Collaborative Asteroid Lightcurve Link derives an albedo of 0.0435 and a diameter of 53.03 kilometers based on an absolute magnitude of 10.4. Besides 3925 Tretʹyakov, it is the highest numbered main-belt asteroid larger than 50 kilometers in diameter, of which there are 642 bodies in total, according to the JPL SBDB.

Naming 

This minor planet was named after Kathleen Willoughby Clifford, granddaughter of the discoverer Clyde Tombaugh (1906–1997). The official naming citation was published by the Minor Planet Center on 28 May 1991.

References

External links 
 Asteroid Lightcurve Database (LCDB), query form (info )
 Dictionary of Minor Planet Names, Google books
 Asteroids and comets rotation curves, CdR – Observatoire de Genève, Raoul Behrend
 Discovery Circumstances: Numbered Minor Planets (1)–(5000) – Minor Planet Center
 
 

003754
Discoveries by Clyde Tombaugh
003754
Named minor planets
19310316